The Grand Prix de Beuvry-la-Forêt was a one-day road cycling race that took place between the cities of around the town of Beuvry-la-Forêt, France. From 2005 to 2008, it was held as a 1.2 event on the UCI Europe Tour. Prior to 2012 the race took place in August before being moved to June.

Winners

References

Cycle races in France
Defunct cycling races in France
2015 disestablishments in France
Recurring sporting events disestablished in 2015
UCI Europe Tour races